The Forum Theatre (originally the State Theatre) is a historic theatre and former cinema now used as a live music and event venue located on the corner of Flinders Street and Russell Street in Melbourne, Australia.

Built in 1929, it was designed by leading US ‘picture palace’ architect John Eberson, in association with the local architectural firm Bohringer, Taylor & Johnson. Designed as an "Atmospheric theatre", the interior intended to evoke a Florentine walled garden, complete with a cerulean-blue ceiling sprinkled with lights like twinkling stars, mimicking a twilight sky.

It was renamed the Forum Theatre in 1962, converted into two separate cinemas in 1963, then after the cinemas' closure used for religious services for several years; however, since 1995, it has operated as live music and events venue Forum Melbourne, more commonly known simply as The Forum.

History
The sites of the former Morning Post-Herald Building (on Flinders Street) and State Migration Office (on Russell Street) were purchased by Rufe Naylor's Empire Theatres Ltd of Sydney with the goal of building a 'live' theatre sister to his Empire in Quay Street, Sydney. The site was subsequently purchased by Managing Director of Union Theatres, Stuart F. Doyle in 1928 for the future development of what was originally known as the State Theatre.

The building features a Moorish Revival exterior, including minarets and a clock tower. When it opened in February 1929, the cinema had the largest seating capacity in Australia, holding 3,371 people. A dual-console Wurlitzer organ of style 270 was installed, the first to be built "west of Chicago", featuring 21 rows of pipes and a grand piano attachment and oboe horn. The organ was removed from the theatre in 1963, and subsequently installed in the Moorabbin Town Hall (now Kingston City Hall) by members of the Victorian Division of the Theatre Organ Society of Australia.

In 1962, the building was renamed the Forum Theatre.

In 1963, recognising the changing trends in attendance, cinema chain Greater Union converted now-oversized auditorium into two smaller separate cinemas. The Dress Circle balcony was blocked in, creating the upstairs Rapallo Theatre (with a new entry from Russell Street) while the Stalls level retained the Forum Theatre name and Flinders Street entry. In 1981 further renovations took place, including the renaming of the cinemas to Forum I and Forum II.

In 1985 it was purchased and used by Revival Centres International, a Christian organisation, and fell into disrepair. In 1995 it was purchased by David Marriner's Staged Developments Australia, who redeveloped it for use as a film and concert venue operating as Forum Melbourne. It became part of Marriner Group's portfolio of theatres, including Melbourne's Princess Theatre and Regent Theatre, and joined by the Comedy Theatre in 1996.

The theatre was listed on the Victorian Heritage Register in 1978 and classified by the National Trust of Australia in 1994.

Current use
Forum I, or Forum Downstairs, is located on the ground floor and is generally used for concerts and other large-scale performances. The second-floor Forum II is a smaller 550-seat theatre-style amphitheatre.

Today, it is used for concerts by many artists, having hosted performances by One Ok Rock, Oasis, Madonna, Ozzy Osbourne, Katy Perry, Cat Power, Jarvis Cocker, Dirty Three, Sufjan Stevens, Dizzee Rascal, Tame Impala, Lily Allen, The Yeah Yeah Yeahs, Harry Styles, Noname, Mac DeMarco, Methyl Ethel, Meg Mac, Bachelor Girl, Mr. Big, Alison Wonderland and Extreme among others.

In more recent times, the Forum has been used as a venue for numerous acts during the Melbourne International Comedy Festival, including local favourite Akmal Saleh and international acts, such as Mark Watson, Jason Byrne, Arj Barker and Megan Mullally among others and in September, Tyler Oakley's Slumber Party.

From 2009 to 2012 the Forum was the primary contemporary music venue for Melbourne Festival in expansive programs featuring scores of international and national music artists. It is also a venue for the annual Melbourne International Film Festival.

In 2016, the Forum underwent a major internal renovation to restore many of its original features and fixtures, including uncovering and restoring the mosaic tile entrance, remoulding and repairing statues, and moving the interior walls back to their original 1929 position. The Forum officially reopened 5 September 2017.

Awards and nominations

Music Victoria Awards
The Music Victoria Awards are an annual awards night celebrating Victorian music. They commenced in 2006. The award for Best Venue was introduced in 2016.

! 
|-
| Music Victoria Awards of 2016
| Forum Theatre
| Best Venue (Over 500 Capacity)
| 
|rowspan="4"| 
|-
| Music Victoria Awards of 2017
| Forum Theatre
| Best Venue (Over 500 Capacity)
| 
|-
| Music Victoria Awards of 2019
| Forum Theatre
| Best Venue (Over 500 Capacity)
| 
|-
| Music Victoria Awards of 2020
| Forum Theatre
| Best Venue (Over 500 Capacity)
| 
|-
| 2021 Music Victoria Awards
| Forum Theatre
| Best Venue (Over 500 Capacity)
| 
| 
|-
| 2022 Music Victoria Awards
| Forum Theatre
| Best Large Venue (Metro)
| 
| 
|-

References

Additional reference
 Thorne, Ross, Picture Palace Architecture in Australia, Sun Books Pty. Ltd., South Melbourne, Victoria, 1976.

External links

Cinemas in Melbourne
Former cinemas
Buildings and structures in Melbourne City Centre
Theatres in Melbourne
Heritage-listed buildings in Melbourne
Event venues established in 1929
1929 establishments in Australia
Moorish Revival architecture in Australia
Music venues in Melbourne